Mary Tudor (Italian: Maria Tudor) is a 1911 Italian silent historical film directed by Giuseppe de Liguoro. It is now a lost film and very little is known about it other than its portrayal of Mary I of England. It might be based on the play Marie Tudor by Victor Hugo. De Liguoro directed a number of historical films during the era.

References

Bibliography 
 Parrill, Sue & Robison, William B. The Tudors on Film and Television. McFarland, 2013.

External links 
 

1911 films
Italian silent short films
Italian historical films
1910s historical films
Films set in the 16th century
Films set in England
Lost Italian films
1910s Italian-language films
Films directed by Giuseppe de Liguoro
Italian black-and-white films
1911 lost films